André Luís dos Santos Ferreira (born 21 October 1959), known as André Luís, is a Brazilian retired footballer who played as a defender, and is the assistant manager of Goiás. He competed in the 1984 Summer Olympics with the Brazil national football team.

References

1959 births
Living people
Association football defenders
Brazilian footballers
Olympic footballers of Brazil
Footballers at the 1984 Summer Olympics
Olympic silver medalists for Brazil
Olympic medalists in football
Sport Club Internacional players
Medalists at the 1984 Summer Olympics
Footballers from Porto Alegre
Brazilian football managers
Esporte Clube São José managers
Grêmio Esportivo Brasil managers